Athletics at the 1967 Mediterranean Games were held in Tunis, Tunisia. It was the first time that women competed at the Mediterranean Games.

Results

Men's events

Women's events

Medal table

References

Exterlal links
Complete 1967 Mediterranean Games Standings.
Mediterranean Games – Past Medallists. GBR Athletics.

Med
Athletics
1967